is a business holdings company headquartered in Totsuka-ku in Yokohama, in the Kanagawa Prefecture of Japan.  It is a subsidiary of Koito Manufacturing Company.  KI Holdings manufactures railway equipment, and aircraft lighting.
In 1967, the company inherited the railway vehicle equipment/seat division and the lighting/electric equipment division of Koito Manufacturing Company.
On 1 August 2011, businesses other than aircraft seats were spun out as "Koito Electric".

History
April, 1915: Koito Genrokuro Shoten

April, 1936: Reorganized as Koito Manufacturing Co.

September, 1947: Established as NAIGAI SHOJI CO.,LTD (predecessor company).

July, 1948: Renamed to KOITO SHOJI CO., LTD.

May, 1957: Renamed to KOITO INDUSTRIES, LIMITED

March, 1988: Listed on the second section of the Tokyo Stock Exchange.

1 August 2011: Koito Industries newly established KOITO ELECTRIC INDUSTRIES, LTD., which took over all businesses excluding the aviation seat business. Concurrently, Koito Industries changed its trade name to KI HOLDINGS., LTD.

19 June 2019: Parent company Koito Manufacturing Co., Ltd. Conducted a tender offer and acquired 92.37% of shares.

30 July 2019: Delisted from the second section of the Tokyo Stock Exchange.

1 August 2019: Became a wholly owned subsidiary of the parent company, Koito Manufacturing Co., Ltd.

Offices
KI Holdings 
    Head Office and Factory: Totsuka-ku, Yokohama, Kanagawa Prefecture, Japan
Koito Electric
    Head Office and Fuji Nagaizumi Factory: Nagaizumi-cho, Shinto-gun, Shizuoka Prefecture, Japan
Okayama Industries
    Head Office and Factory: Oizumi-cho, Guraku-gun, Gunma Prefecture, Japan

Products
Aircraft Seats
KI Holdings manufactured seats for commercial aircraft from 1959, but in February 2010 received a business improvement recommendation from the Japanese Ministry of Land, Infrastructure and Transport.  In June 2011 KI Holdings took measures in response to an airworthiness improvement order issued by the Federal Aviation Administration (FAA) and the European Aviation Safety Agency (EASA).

Railway Seats
Koito Electric and its affiliated company Okayama Sangyo manufacture seats for railway cars.  The Keio 5000 and Tokyu 6020 dual seats are also made by Koito Electric.

Railway Control Equipment and Display Devices
Along with Morio Electric, KI Holdings holds a large share of destination signage, master controllers and destination display devices for the railway industry.
The company also manufacturers interior LED lighting for trains and the "Patto Vision" in-car information display.

Road and Traffic Information Systems
KI Holdings many traffic products such as traffic signals and traffic sign boards.

Home Equipment
KI Holdings manufacturers hand driers, many of which are produced for TOTO.

2009–2010 issues with airline seats
In February 2010, Koito Industries faced a controversy with the Ministry of Land, Infrastructure and Transport of Japan regarding its airline seats. The company was allegedly involved in a seat test falsification, claiming that they omitted part of a test process to test airline seats and used figures from past tests. Koito claimed that they did this because of "heavy number of orders coming and tight scheduling." The problem affected 150,000 seats among over 1,000 Airbus and Boeing planes owned by 32 airlines in 24 countries, causing delays to some aircraft deliveries such as All Nippon Airways' new Inspiration of Japan seats, particularly the premium economy seats.

Airbus, since September 2009, before the scandal, had banned Koito from delivering seats manufactured for Airbus aircraft because of safety violations.

As of July 2010, Boeing no longer allows airlines to fit Koito seats in new-build aircraft.

Related Companies
Koito Manufacturing Co., Ltd.

References

External links

  

Manufacturing companies based in Yokohama
Companies listed on the Tokyo Stock Exchange
Aircraft component manufacturers
Manufacturing companies of Japan
Japanese companies established in 1915